The 1946 United States Senate election in Minnesota took place on November 5, 1946. It was the first election to either of Minnesota's seats in the United States Senate held since the Minnesota Democratic Party and the Farmer-Labor Party of Minnesota merged in 1944, to form the Minnesota Democratic-Farmer-Labor Party. Incumbent U.S. Senator Henrik Shipstead was defeated in the Republican primary by Governor Edward John Thye, who went on to defeat DFL challenger Theodore Jorgenson in the general election.

Democratic–Farmer–Labor primary

Candidates

Declared
 Victor D. Engstrom
 Theodore Jorgenson
 Frank Patrick Ryan

Results

Republican primary

Candidates

Declared
 Carl Krause
 John C. Peterson
 W. F. Schilling
 Henrik Shipstead, Incumbent U.S. Senator since 1923
 Edward J. Thye, Governor of Minnesota since 1943

Results

General election

Results

See also 
 United States Senate elections, 1946 and 1947

References

Minnesota
1946
1946 Minnesota elections